Chewing on Glass & Other Miracle Cures is a studio album by Canadian hip hop artist Sixtoo. It was released on Ninja Tune in 2004. It peaked at number 65 on the CMJ Top 200 chart. Damo Suzuki provided vocals on "Storm Clouds & Silver Linings".

Critical reception

John Bush of AllMusic gave the album 3 stars out of 5, saying, "Sixtoo's productions are dripping with atmosphere, and he possesses the fiending of a soundtracker for sounds that listeners haven't heard before but can immediately associate with a feeling -- and that feeling is usually a delicious sense of dread." Matthew Newton of XLR8R said: "Experimenting with acidic rock guitars and grimy basslines, Sixtoo reveals a new stylistic approach while retaining his signature murky sound."

David Moore of Pitchfork gave the album a 7.8 out of 10, saying: "Where so many electronic artists demonstrate their 'legitimate' acoustic abilities with the insistence of a neglected studio musician, Sixtoo's development as live musician and composer comes across as natural and well-suited to his talents." He called it "an admirably genuine fusion of acoustic composition with the sensibilities of electronic music."

Exclaim! named it the 2nd best electronic album of 2004.

Track listing

Personnel
Credits adapted from liner notes.

 Sixtoo – production, recording
 Damo Suzuki – vocals (16)

References

External links
 

2004 albums
Ninja Tune albums
Sixtoo albums